G. Baley Price (14 March 1905, Brookhaven, Mississippi – 7 November 2006, Lawrence, Kansas) was an American mathematician and historian of American mathematics. He was a president of the Mathematical Association of America.

Career
After graduating with an A.B. from Mississippi College in 1925, G. B. Price went to Harvard University, where he received his M.A. in 1928 and his Ph.D. in 1932 under G. D. Birkhoff with thesis Double Pendulum and Similar Dynamical Systems. Apart from a period of service with the U.S. Army Air Force in England in World War II, Price was a mathematics professor at the University of Kansas from 1937 to 1975 and chair of the mathematics department from 1951 to 1970. He was the co-author of two textbooks (published in 1966 and 1968) and the author of a history of the department of mathematics of the University of Kansas and several articles related to the role of mathematics and mathematicians in World War II. He was president of the Mathematical Association of America (MAA) for the two years 1957–1958 and received the MAA's distinguished service award in 1970.

Price based his book about multicomplex spaces and functions on Corrado Segre's work where  has n imaginary units  all of which commute. But the book primarily treats bicomplex numbers 

The idempotents provide an alternate basis for the bicomplexes:
 (page 19)
Differentiable bicomplex functions f are shown to correspond to a pair of differentiable complex functions f1 and f2:
 (page 131)

Works
 1935: "On reversible dynamical systems", Transactions of the American Mathematical Society 37(1): 51–59, 
 1947: "Some identities in the theory of determinants", American Mathematical Monthly 54:75–90, 
 1951: "Bounds for determinants with dominant principal diagonal", Proceedings of the American Mathematical Society 2: 497–502, 
 1976: , link from Google Books
 1984: 
 1991:

References

1905 births
2006 deaths
American centenarians
Men centenarians
20th-century American mathematicians
21st-century American mathematicians
Harvard University alumni
Mississippi College alumni
People from Brookhaven, Mississippi
Presidents of the Mathematical Association of America
University of Kansas faculty